The West Ice is a patch of the Greenland Sea covered by pack ice during winter time. It is located north of Iceland, between Greenland and Jan Mayen island.

The West Ice is a major breeding ground for seals, especially harp seals and hooded seals. It was discovered in the early 18th century by British whalers. At the time, whalers were not interested in seal hunting as long as there was ample stock of bowhead whales in the area. However, after the 1750s, the whale population had been depleted in the area, and systematic seal hunting started, first by British ships and then by German, Dutch, Danish, Norwegian, and Russian ships. The annual catches were 120,000 animals around 1900, mostly by Norway and Russia, and rose to 350,000 by the 1920s. They then declined, first because of imposed restrictions on total allowable catch and then in response to decreasing market demand. Nevertheless, the seal population in the West Ice was rapidly falling, from an estimated 1,000,000 in 1956 to 100,000 in the 1980s. In the 1980s–1990s, takings of harp seals totaled 8,000–10,000, and annual catches of hooded seals totaled a few thousand between 1997 and 2001. Norway accounts for all recent seal hunting in the West Ice, as Russia has not hunted hooded seals since 1995, and catches harp seals at the East Ice in the White Sea – Barents Sea. 

Seal hunting in the West Ice was a dangerous occupation, as floating ice, storms and winds posed constant threat to the ships; in the 19th century, the hunters often encountered frozen human bodies on the West Ice. A major accident occurred around 5 April 1952 when a sudden storm surprised 53 ships hunting in the area. Seven of them sank and five vanished, namely Ringsel, Brattind and Vårglimt from Troms and Buskøy and Pels from Sunnmøre, with 79 men on board. The search for them involved ships and planes and continued for many days, but no trace of the missing boats was found.

References

Bodies of ice of Iceland
Seas of Greenland
Geography of North America
Geography of Northern Europe
Ice sheets
Sea ice
Seal hunting
Atlantic Ocean